Alice Mona Alison Caird (née Alison; 24 May 1854 – 4 February 1932) was an English novelist and essayist. Her feminist writings and views caused controversy in the late 19th century. She also advocated for animal rights and civil liberties, and contributed to advancing the interests of the New Woman in the public sphere.

Life and writings
Caird was born in Ryde, Isle of Wight, the elder daughter of John Alison of Midlothian, Scotland, who some biographies claim to have invented the vertical boiler, and Matilda Hector, who the 1871 census records state was born in Schleswig-Holstein, at the time part of Denmark. Her parents were married on 21 June 1853 in St Leonards (near Glenelg, South Australia), her father being based in Melbourne and her mother Matilda the eldest daughter of a prominent citizen. Caird wrote stories and plays from early childhood that reveal a proficiency in French and German as well as English. One childhood friend was the art critic Elizabeth Sharp, who married William Sharp.

In December 1877, she married James Alexander Henryson, son of Sir James Caird. Her husband farmed some 1700 acres (688 ha) of estates in Cassencary, Scotland. Some eight years older, he supported her independence. While he lived at Cassencary and Northbrook House, Micheldever, Hampshire, she spent much time in London and abroad. She mixed with literary people, including Thomas Hardy, who admired her work, and educated herself in the humanities and science. The Cairds had one child, a son born on 22 March 1884 and named Alison James (see England and Wales birth records), but whom she called Alister. Her husband adopted the surname Henryson-Caird in 1897; he died in 1921.

Caird published her first two novels, Whom Nature Leadeth (1883) and One That Wins (1887), under the pseudonym "G. Noel Hatton", but little heed was paid to them. Her later writings bore her own name. She became prominent in 1888 when the Westminster Review printed an article by her, "Marriage", in which she analysed indignities historically suffered by women in marriage, calling its present state a "vexatious failure" and advocating equality and autonomy between marriage partners. London's Daily Telegraph responded with a series called "Is Marriage a Failure?", which drew a reported 27,000 letters from around the world and continued for three months. Feeling her views had been misunderstood, she published another article, "Ideal Marriage", later that year. Her many essays on marriage and women's issues written in 1888–1894 were collected in The Morality of Marriage and Other Essays on the Status and Destiny of Women in 1897.

Caird next published the novel The Wing of Azrael (1889), which deals with marital rape: Viola Sedley murders her cruel husband in self-defence. Next came a short story collection, A Romance of the Moors (1891), where in the title story, a widowed artist, Margaret Ellwood, stirs up a young couple by counselling them to each become independent and self-sufficient. Her best-known novel, The Daughters of Danaus (1894), tells of Hadria Fullerton, who aspires to be a composer, but finds that her obligations to her family and parents and as a wife and mother, allow little time for it. This has since been seen as a feminist classic. Also well known is her short story "The Yellow Drawing-Room" (1892), where Vanora Haydon defies the conventional separation of spheres of men and women. Such works of hers have been called "fiction of the New Woman".

Active in the women's suffrage movement from her early twenties, Caird joined the National Society for Women's Suffrage in 1878 and later the Women's Franchise League, the Women's Emancipation Union, and the London Society for Women's Suffrage. Her essay "Why Women Want the Franchise" was read at the 1892 WEU Conference. In 1908, she published the essay "Militant Tactics and Woman's Suffrage" and took part in the second Hyde Park women's suffrage demonstration. She was also opposed to vivisection, writing much on the subject, including "The Sanctuary of Mercy" (1895), "Beyond the Pale" (1896), "The Ethics of Vivisection" (1900), and a play, "The Logicians: An episode in dialogue" (1902), where characters argue opposing views on the issue.

Caird was a member of the Theosophical Society from 1904 to 1909. Among her later writings is an illustrated volume of travel essays, Romantic Cities of Provence (1906), and novels: The Stones of Sacrifice (1915), showing harmful effects of self-sacrifice on women, and The Great Wave (1931), a work of social-science fiction attacking the racism of negative eugenics.

Mona Caird died on 4 February 1932 in Hampstead at the age of 77.

Bibliography
Caird wrote seven novels, several short stories, various essays and a travel book:
Whom Nature Leadeth (1883) novel
One That Wins (1887) novel
Marriage (1888) essay
"Ideal Marriage" (1888) essay
The Wing of Azrael (1889) novel
"The Emancipation of the Family" (1890) essay
A Romance of The Moors (1891) stories
"The Yellow Drawing-Room" (1892) story
"A Defence of the So-Called Wild Women" (1892) essay
The Daughters of Danaus (1894) novel
"The Sanctuary of Mercy" (1895) essay
"A Sentimental View of Vivisection" (1895) essay
"Vivisection: An Appeal to the Workers" (1895) essay
"Beyond the Pale: An Appeal on Behalf of the Victims of Vivisection" (1897) extended essay
The Morality of Marriage and Other Essays on the Status and Destiny of Women (1897) essays
The Pathway of the Gods (1898) novel
"The Ethics of Vivisection" (1900) essay
The Logicians: An episode in dialogue (1902) play
Romantic Cities of Provence (1906) travel
"Militant Tactics and Woman's Suffrage" (1908) essay
"The Stones of Sacrifice" (1915) essay
The Great Wave (1931) novel

Notes

References

Further reading
Beverly E. Schneller, "Caird, (Alice) Mona (1854–1932)", Oxford Dictionary of National Biography, Oxford University Press, 2004, accessed 21 February 2007

External links

1854 births
1932 deaths
19th-century English novelists
19th-century English non-fiction writers
19th-century English women writers
19th-century English writers
20th-century English novelists
20th-century English women writers
Anti-vivisectionists
British vegetarianism activists
British women essayists
Deaths from cancer in England
English animal rights activists
English feminist writers
English pacifists
English feminists
English Theosophists
English suffragettes
English suffragists
English women dramatists and playwrights
English women non-fiction writers
English women novelists
National Society for Women's Suffrage
People from Ryde
Victorian novelists
Victorian women writers